Madana Kama Rajan is a 1941 Indian Tamil-language adventure film directed by B. N . Rao and produced by S. S. Vasan. It was the first film for Vasan as producer for Dindugal Amirtham Talkies.

Plot 
Madana Kama Rajan is tale of the adventures of a prince (V. V. Sadagopan) and his friend (N. Krishnamurthi).

Cast 
Cast according to the opening credits of the film

Male cast
 V. V. Satagopan as Madana Kama Rajan
 N. Krishnamurthi as Gunaseelan
 Kothamangalam Subbu as Rajaguru
 T. S. Durairaj as Dhandavan
 M. R. Swaminathan as Somadevan
 V. P. S. Mani as Mayendra Varman
 Puliyur Duraisami Iyer as Boy
 G. V. Sharma as Bhimavarman
 K. Sivaraman as Vengaian
 T. Gopal Rao as Torturer
 S. G. Rajam as Sangan

Female cast
 K. L. V. Vasantha as Premavalli
 M. V. Rajamma as Sathyavathi
 K. R. Chellam as Kamavalli
 M. S. Sundari Bai as Bhagavathi
 E. S. Kamalakumari as Rasika
 K. T. Sakku Bai as Lakshmakkal
 K. V. Lakshmi Devi as Manmadan

Reception 
The film was released on 28 November 1941 and was a commercial success. Gemini Studios went on to become a major player in the Tamil film industry. The Indian Express wrote, "The music in the film is essentially Carnatic and the humour is clean and intelligent, two very welcome reforms in the world of Tamil films."

Soundtrack 
Partial list of songs in Madana Kama Rajan:
 "Prema Premanee Illamal" – V. V. Sadagopan
 "Ennai Therri Thoodhu Sella" – K. L. V. Vasantha
 "Ambaa Un Paatham" – M. V. Rajamma
 "Kai Koduppen Amma" – M. V. Rajamma

References

External links 
 

1941 films
1940s Tamil-language films
Indian black-and-white films
Indian adventure films
Films scored by M. D. Parthasarathy
Films scored by S. Rajeswara Rao